Vindex, Maryland may refer to the following places in Western Maryland:

East Vindex, Maryland
West Vindex, Maryland